Henry Long (26 July 1927 – 8 July 2019) was an international speedway rider from South Africa.

Speedway career 
Long was a leading speedway rider in the 1950s. He reached the final of the Speedway World Championship in the 1952 Individual Speedway World Championship.

He rode in the top tier of British Speedway, riding for the Belle Vue Aces.

World final appearances

Individual World Championship
 1952 -  London, Wembley Stadium - 10th - 7pts

References 

1927 births
2019 deaths
South African speedway riders
White South African people
Belle Vue Aces riders
Sheffield Tigers riders
People from Alberton, Gauteng